"Rayon de soleil" (English: "Ray of Sunshine") is the name of a 2008 song recorded by the African singer William Baldé. It was his debut single and was released in July 2008 from his album En Corps étranger. It achieved success, becoming a number-one hit in France and Belgium.

Chart performances
In France, the song was announced as the "uncontested summer hit of 2008". The single went straight to number 1 in France with 22,135 sales, and stayed there for other eight non-consecutive weeks. In its sixth week, 23,298 copies were sold, which is to date the second best weekly sales of the year for a number-one hit in France. It remained in the top 50 for 17 weeks and in the top 100 for 24 weeks. It was the second best-selling single of the year, behind "Tired of Being Sorry (Laisse le destin l'emporter)".

It achieved a minor success in Switzerland, peaking at #24 in its fourth week. It also topped the chart in its eighth week in Belgium (Wallonia) and remained in the top 40 for 22 weeks.

As sign of popularity, the song and the music video were included on the famous double compilation NRJ Music Awards 2009.

Track listings
 CD single
 "Rayon de soleil" — 3:39
 "Yönn-gui" — 5:08
 "Rayon de soleil" (video)

 Digital download
 "Rayon de soleil" (single version) — 5:02
 "Rayon de soleil" (album version) — 4:26

Charts and sales

Peak positions

Year-end charts

References

2008 debut singles
William Baldé songs
Ultratop 50 Singles (Wallonia) number-one singles
SNEP Top Singles number-one singles
2008 songs